Krisztinaváros is a neighborhood in central Budapest, situated just west of Castle Hill, north of Tabán. It is named after Archduchess Maria Christina, daughter of Maria Theresa, who interceded for buildings to be erected in this area. The history of Krisztinaváros is inseparable from that of the neighboring old Tabán, Naphegy and Gellérthegy.

The central features are Krisztina tér and the entrance to the Castle Hill tunnel. It is also home to the Tabán Cinema, a small cinema that presents art films and documentaries. (Despite its name, this cinema belongs to Krisztinaváros, not Tabán.)

Sights

Monuments 
 Krisztina Tér Church 
 Gesztenyéskert, a huge park with chestnut trees, previously the old Krisztinaváros Cemetery
 Mom park, with modern office buildings and Novotel Szálló (Hotel Novotel).

Historical cafés and restaurants
Philadelphia Kávéház

Notable residents 
 Dezső Szabó, author
 Géza Ottlik, writer
 Sándor Márai, Hungarian writer and journalist.
 Vilmos Aba-Novák, painter

Gallery

See also 
 Tabán
 Krisztina Téri Iskola 
 Naphegy

References

External links 
 Historical documents about the area
 Historical documents about the area

Neighbourhoods of Budapest
Várkerület
Buda